Michael Douglas Newton (born May 10, 1952) was an American field hockey player, who competed at the 1984 Summer Olympics in Los Angeles. 

Newton was born in Penticton, British Columbia, Canada. His brother Gary Newton was one of his Olympic teammates.

References

External links
 

1952 births
American male field hockey players
Canadian emigrants to the United States
Canadian male field hockey players
Field hockey players at the 1984 Summer Olympics
Living people
Olympic field hockey players of the United States
Sportspeople from Penticton